Penthema formosanum is a butterfly of the family Nymphalidae. It is endemic to Taiwan.

The wingspan is 70–85 mm.

The larvae have been recorded on Sinocalamus oldhami, Bambusa multiplex and Phyllostachys makinoi.

References

Elymniini